In physics, the study of rigid body motion allows for several ways to define the acceleration of a body. The usual definition of acceleration entails following a single particle/point of a rigid body and observing its changes in velocity. Spatial acceleration entails looking at a fixed (unmoving) point in space and observing the change in velocity of the particles that pass through that point. This is similar to the definition of acceleration in fluid dynamics, where typically one measures velocity and/or acceleration at a fixed point inside a testing apparatus.

Definition 
Consider a moving rigid body and the velocity of a point P on the body being a function of the position and velocity of a center-point C and the angular velocity . 

The linear velocity vector  at P is expressed in terms of the velocity vector  at C as:

where  is the angular velocity vector.

The material acceleration at P is:

where  is the angular acceleration vector.

The spatial acceleration  at P is expressed in terms of the spatial acceleration  at C as:

which is similar to the velocity transformation above. 

In general the spatial acceleration  of a particle point P that is moving with linear velocity  is derived from the material acceleration  at P as:

References

 This reference effectively combines screw theory with rigid body dynamics for robotic applications. The author also chooses to use spatial accelerations extensively in place of material accelerations as they simplify the equations and allows for compact notation. See online presentation, page 23 also from same author.
JPL DARTS page has a section on spatial operator algebra as well as an extensive list of references.
 This reference defines spatial accelerations for use in rigid body mechanics.

Rigid bodies
Acceleration